Gábor Boldoczki (born 1976 in Szeged, Hungary) is a Hungarian trumpeter who plays Classical music.

He played first trumpet in 2004 in the Salzburg Festival. He has been a professor of trumpet at the Franz Liszt Academy of Music since 2010.

External links
 Home page

Classical trumpeters
1976 births
Living people
People from Szeged
21st-century trumpeters
Date of birth missing (living people)
21st-century Hungarian musicians